A list of animated feature films released in 2004

Highest-grossing animated film of the year

See also
 List of animated television series of 2004

References

Bibliography

 
 
 

 Feature films
2004
2004-related lists